"Ring Around the Moon" is the fourth episode of the first season of Space: 1999.  The screenplay was written by Edward di Lorenzo; the director was Ray Austin.  The shooting script is dated 14 December 1973 with green page amendments dated 17 January 1974; the final shooting script is dated 8 February 1974.  Live-action filming took place Wednesday 27 February 1974 through Thursday 14 March 1974.

Story
Technician Ted Clifford enters Main Mission to perform a minor maintenance task.  As he unpacks his tool kit at an access panel near one of the windows, he fails to notice a sphere of orange light materialising above the lunar horizon.  The sphere pulsates and Clifford stiffens as an aura of orange light surrounds his head.  Zombie-like, he crosses Main Mission and begins to operate an input terminal on Main Computer with incredible speed.  A man possessed, he fends off all attempts to drag him away from the keypad with super-human strength.

Suddenly, Clifford backs away from the computer bank.  He whimpers Help me, collapses and dies.  Before anyone can react, the Main Mission staff are knocked off their feet by a tremendous jolt—a beam of orange light has reached out from the sphere and enveloped the Moon.  Tracking sensors reveal the sphere to be stationary but, from their perspective, it is still getting closer to the Moon's surface; John Koenig realises that the Moon has been trapped in an orbit around the sphere.  An audio signal is received and a sibilant voice announces that they are prisoners of the planet Triton.

The staff reviews the damage caused by the Moon's sudden deceleration.  The fact that all but four Eagles are non-operational and the main generators show no sign of damage but are only putting out minimum power indicates that the sphere's occupants have purposefully compromised Alpha's defences.  David Kano reveals that Clifford had accessed and scanned classified information during his mad session with Computer.  With no information on Triton available, Koenig feels a reconnaissance flight is in order. Victor Bergman comments that he thinks the aliens will not be surprised; he has a nasty feeling they are now being watched.

Koenig receives a report on Ted Clifford's autopsy from Doctors Helena Russell and Bob Mathias—a ball of orange light was briefly visible at the base of his brain, with most of the surrounding brain tissue appearing to have melted.  Also, his optic nerve had been reconfigured to function like a high-speed camera and the processing speed of his neuronal system having been increased a thousandfold.  The conclusion reached is that Clifford's physiology was re-structured by the aliens to function as a computer.  During this, Bergman's suspicions are confirmed as the viewer is taken into the sphere where unseen entities reside in a black void, surrounded by swirling coloured light and melodic sound.  They observe the goings-on in the Alpha Medical Centre...and seem especially interested in Helena.

Alan Carter and co-pilot Jim Donovan lift-off in Eagle Three—also under alien observation—to reconnoitre the sphere.  On approach, the ship is deflected by a force-beam of orange light.  Both astronauts are rendered unconscious, and the Eagle is sent tumbling out of control back towards the Moon.  With controls set to manual, Paul Morrow cannot use his remote link to establish control and bring them back safely.  Eagle Three crash-lands seven hundred metres from the Moonbase perimeter.  With no other means available, Koenig decides to lead a rescue team on foot.  Halfway to the downed Eagle, Koenig's party is ambushed; a ball of orange light approaches and Helena is compelled to walk into it.  Koenig attempts to prevent her abduction, but is thrust back and rendered unconscious.  The light, with Helena, disappears.

Back at Alpha, Koenig regains consciousness and learns of Helena's abduction and the death of Carter's co-pilot.  Bergman reckons the crash was nothing more than a lure to get Helena out on the surface and unprotected for unknown reasons.  Koenig wants to make another attempt to penetrate the sphere; he proposes to Bergman that in order to defeat the Tritonian force-field effect, they need to radically increase the strength of their Eagles' standard anti-gravity screens.

Helena materialises in the black void, clad in gossamer robes.  She converses with her unseen captors, telling them the Alphans mean them no harm and that they need their help.  The Tritonian voice says that it is she that will help them; they are the eyes of Triton and everything that was, is, and will be is recorded by them.  A frenetic light-show ensues as Helena is unknowingly processed by the Tritonians.

The modified Eagle is ready and Koenig and Carter take-off to rendezvous with the sphere.  The strengthened anti-gravity screens effectively thwart the power of the projected force-beam.  The aliens then reverse the field and the Eagle is suddenly dragged forward at incredible velocity.  Before being rendered unconscious by the mounting g-forces, Koenig manages to switch the instruments to automatic and Morrow brings them safely back to Alpha.  During this activity, a ball of light drops down to the Moon's surface and, at an Alpha airlock station, deposits a smiling Helena.

Helena is taken to Medical for a comprehensive work-up.  All the tests come back fine, except one—despite all evidence to the contrary, the results of her eye exam indicate she should be blind.  Faced with this physiological contradiction, the only logical conclusion is that she has undergone the same processing procedure used on Ted Clifford.  Moving to Bergman's quarters, the professor finds a possible reference to the Tritonians as the 'Eyes of Heaven' in the Pyramid Texts of the Old Kingdom of Ancient Egypt, revealing their long-term observation of Mankind.

Helena recalls that she was not wearing her spacesuit, indicating the sphere contains a breathable atmosphere.  With that, Bergman speculates the Tritonians may have a recognisable humanoid form.  This brainstorming session is interrupted by the Tritonians' activation of Helena.  In a trance-like state, she moves through Alpha, dematerialising at will to avoid all obstacles.  She reaches Main Mission and approaches the Main Computer terminal.  There, she begins the same hyperactive operation of Computer as Clifford had done.

Kano reviews the accessed memory cells; he reports one of the first cells scanned and transmitted through Helena stored the complete schematics of the Moonbase life-support system.  At the rate of her current activity, Bergman surmises that they have 132 hours until Helena exhausts Computer's memory store.  Mathias, though, reports that she will be dead long before that.  Bergman and Koenig meet to discuss the Triton entities, figuring they must have some physical limitation that prevents them from leaving their sphere.

Each brings some important information to the table.  Bergman has determined from his galaxy charts that the planet Triton no longer exists.  Koenig forwards a report from Kano that the malfunction of a computer memory cell disabled the Triton force-field for the thirty-two seconds required for the system to correct the error.  They realise that there must be a circuit from the sphere, to the force-field around the Moon, to Helena, to Computer, and back to the sphere.  With all the other components controlled by the Triton probe, Computer is the only exploitable link in the chain.

A plan is formulated to intentionally jam twenty-five key memory circuits in Computer, negating the force-field for the thirteen minutes required to fly to the sphere.  During this time, Kano will 'hard-wire' the astronomical data proving Triton's destruction into Computer so that it can be the only information transmitted by Helena.  Koenig hopes to persuade the Triton probe that, with the death of its home world, its function is obsolete, and to release Helena and the Moon.

The plan is carried out.  With the force-field down, Koenig and a squad of Security men travel to the sphere and enter it unobstructed.  They disembark and, while searching the black void, Koenig is isolated and makes first-hand contact with the Tritonians.  They appear as floating spheres of striated brain-tissue embedded with a single huge eye.  They reveal to Koenig that their purpose is to gather information on Earthmen in preparation for a potential invasion of Triton.  Furthermore, they have permitted Koenig's plan to succeed with the intent of delivering him to their domain—he, too, will be processed and become Helena's replacement after her death.

By this time, Computer has cleared the affected memory cells.  The force-field returns and Helena is reactivated.  She transmits the data on Triton to the sphere, where Koenig forces the entities to acknowledge the demise of their home planet.  Faced with the fact of a purposeless existence, the Tritonians opt to self-destruct.  Koenig and company scramble back to the Eagle and take off as the sphere disintegrates around them.  As Bergman and Helena watch on the big screen, their ship emerges, barely escaping the final explosion.

Later, Helena is given a clean bill of health by Mathias and shows no lasting effects of her abduction.  Bergman is pensive, noting that even with their immense body of knowledge, the Tritonians could not endure. He muses that "Perhaps knowledge isn't the answer." Koenig then counters: "Then what is?"

Cast

Starring
 Martin Landau — Commander John Koenig
 Barbara Bain — Doctor Helena Russell

Also Starring
 Barry Morse — Professor Victor Bergman

Featuring
 Prentis Hancock — Controller Paul Morrow
 Clifton Jones — David Kano
 Zienia Merton — Sandra Benes
 Anton Phillips — Doctor Bob Mathias
 Nick Tate — Captain Alan Carter
 Max Faulkner — Ted Clifford

Uncredited Artists
 Suzanne Roquette — Tanya
 Michael Stevens — Man in Corridor
 Chai Lee — Anna Wong (removed from final cut)
 Prentis Hancock — Triton Probe Voice

Music
An original score was composed for this episode by Vic Elms and music editor Alan Willis.  Against expectations, Elms (who was producer Sylvia Anderson's son-in-law) thought he could improvise a score with the musicians the day of recording, as he could neither read nor write music.  To avoid a walkout, Willis stepped in, hurriedly set some of Elms's themes down on paper, and conducted the musicians himself.  Barry Gray wanted the music to be in the style of Maurice Ravel; Elms and Willis's final product is more reminiscent of the rock idioms of the day of the bands Deep Purple, Emerson, Lake & Palmer and Yes. A track from the Thunderbirds episode The Mighty Atom can also be heard in the episode.

Production Notes
 The original concept for this episode, involving UFOs and alien abduction, was one of ten episodes outlines devised for the writers' guide prior to production of "Breakaway". Whether this original concept was conceived by script editor Edward di Lorenzo or whether he adapted the idea is unclear.  The ideas presented in the production bear striking resemblances to di Lorenzo's script writing for Mel Welles' Lady Frankenstein, a 1972 attempt to update the Frankenstein myth by adding issues related to gender, ecology and power/knowledge. (Many themes from this movie were reworked into "Ring Around The Moon" and his subsequent stories for the series "Missing Link" and "Alpha Child".)
 In the original script, the planet name was Uralt (German for 'ancient'), not Triton. As the theme of the episode is the foundation of science and whether the human condition can be understood from the point of rationality alone, it seems somewhat unclear why they changed from Uralt to Triton.  In early drafts, Chief Engineer Smith (or Smitty, as introduced in "Black Sun") is a minor character.  He does not appear in the final shooting script, although there is a reference to a Chief Engineer Anderson, which may be an internal joke referring to Gerry Anderson's obsession with technical issues.
 In general, the story seems to be about the relationship between power and knowledge, and, to a large extent, appears to be a visualization of some of Michel Foucault's main writings.  The story has a strong visual style with vivid colour and abstract light effects. Some have compared the visual style to the German Expressionist cinema, others have found parallels in the French and Eastern European Theatre of the Absurd.  A preproduction painting by Keith Wilson shows a strong 2001: A Space Odyssey influence.  From a visual point of view, the episode could perhaps be seen as a paraphrase over the final third of 2001, consisting of the psychedelic "journey through time" sequence and the study of the astronauts M. C. Escher-like reflections on his own self-image.
 Ray Austin made his debut as a director on Space: 1999 with this episode. Probably due to having been a stuntman and stunt coordinator before taking up direction, his approach on this particular episode and all later episodes of Space: 1999 has a very clear physical presence. The episode is extremely visual with a lot of movement, contrapunctual to the philosophical and cerebral contents of the story.  Austin's style of direction has sometimes been compared to that of Alfred Hitchcock, and throughout Space: 1999 there are a number of quotes to the master.  This particular entry has from time to time been compared with Rope (1948).

Novelisation
The episode was adapted in the first Year One Space: 1999 novel Breakaway by E.C. Tubb, published in 1975.  As with most of his work for the series, Tubb took many liberties with the details of this teleplay.  The probe's home of Triton was no longer a planet two million light-years from Earth, but the moon of Neptune, which in this narrative, had gone missing some few years before 1999.  Bergman also creates the anti-gravity shield specifically for the purpose of penetrating the Triton ship's forcefield, having gained the knowledge required to perfect the technique from the atomic-waste explosion earlier in the novel.  Having been convinced of the demise of its home, the probe chooses to self-destruct—though not before warning the Alphans of their impending encounter with a black sun.

Response
"Ring Around the Moon" appears to split fans. According to some, 'it is generally regarded as one of the lesser first season episodes'. Others, however, see it as the ultimate experience in science fiction, similar to Alphaville, 2001: A Space Odyssey and Solaris. In a review in the Gerry Anderson-related fanzine Andersonic, Richard Farrell interprets the plot as a philosophical discussion of the difference between knowledge and wisdom: "the Tritonians merely seek knowledge, whereas the Alphans use the facts they have learned (about Triton in this case) as a means to an end, i.e. saving Helena and escaping." . He concludes "The writer's point is alluded to in the epilogue when Victor muses on the Triton probe, 'All that knowledge and yet... perhaps knowledge isn't the answer after all'. Di Lorenzo's answer, perhaps, is being able to accumulate the wisdom to put that knowledge to some use."

Although feeling "the plot itself is undeniably a little thin" he praises director Ray Austin's "stylized use of sound" and the lighting particularly inside the Tritonian sphere which "imbue the sequences with a sense of tension and atmosphere - the aliens are heard but never seen".

References

External links
Space: 1999 - "Ring Around the Moon" - The Catacombs episode guide
Space: 1999 - "Ring Around the Moon" - Moonbase Alpha's Space: 1999 page
Discussion Group
"Ring Around The Moon" Episode Review at Andersonic.co.uk

1976 British television episodes
Space: 1999 episodes